Giuliano Cenci (Florence, 10 August 1931 - Florence, 12 April 2018) was an Italian animated film director.

Biography 
In 1949 he obtained the Diploma of Artistic Maturity at the Art School of Florence. Still a student, he began working in the graphic arts sector, cultivating, as a self-taught, a true passion for cartoons. His most famous work is the animated feature film The Adventures of Pinocchio (1972), in which the artist wanted to create an adaptation of Carlo Collodi's novel The Adventures of Pinocchio as close as possible to the original. Cenci was the director, screenwriter and co-producer of the film, as well as having personally done a good part of the animation (shared with the animator Italo Marazzi).

Giuliano Cenci is the artist who:

 the first who realize in Italy, in 1957, the coupling between animated cartoon and live footage, i.e. the technique of live action / animated film, creating a short film mixed technique on Prehistory, filmed from the truth in 16mm with their relatives interacting with animated characters (in particular the daughter Patrizia who, smiling, cradles a dwarf in her arms) and subsequently realizing many cartoons combined with the advertising for Carosello;
 first has invented in Italy the animation in Stop Animation, Model Animation and Clay Animation, with a particular system of colored plasticine that was born in Cenci, a forerunner of [Pongo, realizing numerous experiments of Puppet animation that interact with the movie from life;
 in the 2D animation has made significant technical improvements to Special effects, never made before in Italy, as the water technique clearly visible in the feature film of 1971 The Adventures of Pinocchio (still an extraordinary invention) or as the Disney system of Rotoscoping used by Cenci always in his film, the same used at the end of the following decade by Ralph Bakshi for Lord of the Rings;
 in the 60s he created, with the precious contribution of his father Guido and his brother Renzo, two Verticali Cinematografiche, equipped with electronic control units, able to obtain complex special effects never before realized in Italy.

Carosello 
In 1957, still twenty-five, Giuliano Cenci designed for Philco the first animated advertisements, creating a cartoon show together with the product to be advertised: this is why Cenci can truly be defined as the "father" of Carosello. And, thanks to the extraordinary novelty created by the Florentine artist, the most successful program of Italian TV allowed the greatest talents of the animation of those years to express all their creative flair, from 1957 to 1977.

In the 1960s Giuliano Cenci was one of the founders in Milan, together with other Italian cartoonists and producers of cartoons, of the I.S.C.A. (Institute for the Study and Dissemination of Animation Cinema), then became ASIFA Italia.
At that time, as a young cartoonist but already with an important professional background, he decided to realize the personal dream of a "first work", to sign the direction of a cartoon film! In the meantime, he also works at the technical office of the City of Florence as a project assistant, dividing his time between his office and his home where his feature film will be born. Through a popular shareholder and after 5 years of work, with a team of 50 technicians and designers with the same passion for cartoons, the film A puppet by the name of Pinocchio was filmed in 1971, shot in 35mm eastmancolor and produced for the film circuit.

References 

1931 births
2018 deaths
Film people from Florence
Italian animators
Italian animated film directors
Stop motion animators
Clay animators